Nebria apuana is a species of ground beetle in the Nebriinae subfamily that is endemic to Italy.

References

apuana
Beetles described in 1980
Beetles of Europe
Endemic fauna of Italy